Reflections is a compilation album by American pop group The 5th Dimension, released in 1971. It contains songs from while the band was recording for Soul City Records. It includes four songs that were originally released as A-side singles, although only one was a Top 20 hit ("California Soul", #25; "Blowin' Away", #21; "Carpet Man", #29; "Workin' On a Groovy Thing", #20). Bell Records released Greatest Hits on Earth the following year, which would include The 5th Dimension's biggest hits from both current label Bell Records and prior label Soul City Records. 

The #16 hit "Go Where You Wanna Go" – The 5th Dimension's first Top 20 single – does not appear on either album nor did it appear on their original Greatest Hits compilation for Soul City, a Top 5 smash in 1970. The song only appears on The July 5th Album, released in 1970 and a compilation akin to a Greatest Hits, Volume 2.

Track listing
"California Soul"
"Let It Be Me"
"Sunshine of Your Love"
"Poor Side of Town"
"Ticket to Ride"
"Blowin' Away"
"Workin' On a Groovy Thing"
"Carpet Man"
"Those Were the Days"
"It'll Never Be The Same Again"
"California My Way"

Personnel
Marilyn McCoo - vocals
Florence LaRue - vocals
Billy Davis Jr. - vocals
Lamonte McLemore - vocals
Ron Townson - vocals

The 5th Dimension albums
1971 compilation albums
Bell Records compilation albums